Launch Complex 29 (LC-29) was a one-pad launch site at Cape Canaveral Space Force Station, Florida built for test flights of the US Navy's submarine-launched Polaris ballistic missiles from 1958–1980. It also launched Chevaline missiles, which were British Polaris A-3 missiles.

The complex was designed to contain two launch pads, 29A and 29B, but only 29A was built. The launch complex was dismantled in 1980.

In November 2012, ground was broken for a new $185-million Navy missile test facility to be built over the underground structures at LC-25 and LC-29 called the  Strategic Weapons System Ashore.  The facility will allow the testing of fire control, launch systems and navigation for submarine-fired missiles to be conducted at one facility instead of being done by contractors in different locations around the country.

Launch history

Polaris A1X: 14 launches  (21 September 1959–29 April 1960)
Polaris A-2: 15 launches  (10 January 1961–12 November 1965)
Polaris A-3: 18 launches  (7 August 1962–1 November 1967)
Polaris A-3 Antelope:  3 launches  (17 November 1966–2 March 1967)
British Chevaline launches:  (11 September 1977–19 May 1980)

Notes

References
Moody, Norman "Cape's Navy Missile Site Will Expand" (November 8, 2012) Florida Today. Retrieved 8 November 2012.

Cape Canaveral Space Force Station